The 1899 New Hampshire football team was an American football team that represented New Hampshire College of Agriculture and the Mechanic Arts during the 1899 college football season—the school became the University of New Hampshire in 1923. The team finished with a record of 3–3–1 or 4–2, per 1899 sources or modern sources, respectively.

Schedule
Scoring during this era awarded five points for a touchdown, one point for a conversion kick (extra point), and five points for a field goal. Teams played in the one-platoon system and the forward pass was not yet legal. Games were played in two halves rather than four quarters.

A December editorial in The New Hampshire College Monthly stated that the team's record was 3–3–1, whereas College Football Data Warehouse and the University's media guide list a record of 4–2.

Contemporary sources are clear that the Vermont game was played in Vermont; modern sources list the site as Durham.

The October 21 game was the first meeting between the New Hampshire and Boston College football programs. The November 4 game was the first meeting between the New Hampshire and Vermont football programs.

Notes

References

New Hampshire
New Hampshire Wildcats football seasons
New Hampshire football